William Arjona (born 31 July 1979) is a Brazilian volleyball player, a member of Brazil men's national volleyball team and Brazilian club Sada Cruzeiro. He is a 2016 Olympic Champion. Arjona was called up for the adult national team for the first time in 2003, he played four years in Bolivar, where he conquered the national championship four times and was chosen as the best player in the country. He came back in Brazil in 2010 to play for Sada Cruzeiro, where he won the Superliga 2012 as the best setter in the competition. In 2013, he was called and took part in Brazil World League silver medal campaign and won the gold medal in the South American Championship. 
Arjona was named Best Setter in World Club Championship.
William Arjona won the FIVB world league with Sada Cruzeiro three times in 2013, 2015 and 2016.

Sporting achievements

Clubs

FIVB Club World Championship

  2012 – with Sada Cruzeiro
  2013 – with Sada Cruzeiro
  2015 – with Sada Cruzeiro
  2016 – with Sada Cruzeiro

South American Club Championship
  2010 – with Drean Bolívar
  2012 – with Sada Cruzeiro
  2014 – with Sada Cruzeiro
  2015 – with Sada Cruzeiro
  2016 – with Sada Cruzeiro
  2017 – with Sada Cruzeiro

National Championship
 1996/1997  Brazilian Superliga, with ECUS/Suzano
 2006/2007  Argentinian Liga, with Drean Bolívar
 2007/2008  Argentinian Liga, with Drean Bolívar
 2008/2009  Argentinian Liga, with Drean Bolívar
 2009/2010  Argentinian Liga, with Drean Bolívar
 2011/2012  Brazilian Superliga, with Sada Cruzeiro
 2013/2014  Brazilian Superliga, with Sada Cruzeiro
 2014/2015  Brazilian Superliga, with Sada Cruzeiro
 2015/2016  Brazilian Superliga, with Sada Cruzeiro
 2016/2017  Brazilian Superliga, with Sada Cruzeiro

National team
 2013  FIVB World League
 2013  South American Championship
 2016  FIVB World League
 2016  Olympic Games
 2018  FIVB World Championship

Individual
 1997 FIVB U19 World Championship – Best Setter
 1998 U21 South American Championship – Best Setter
 2004/05 Brazilian Superliga – Best Setter
 2006/07 Liga Argentina – Most Valuable Player
 2006/07 Liga Argentina – Best Setter
 2007/08 Liga Argentina – Most Valuable Player
 2007/08 Liga Argentina – Best Setter
 2008/09 Liga Argentina – Best Setter
 2009/10 Liga Argentina – Best Setter
 2010/11 Brazilian Superliga – Best Setter
 2011/12 Brazilian Superliga - Best Setter
 2012 South American Club Championship - Best Setter
 2012/13 Brazilian Superliga - Best Setter
 2012 FIVB Club World Championship - Best Setter
 2013 FIVB Club World Championship - Best Setter
 2013/14 Brazilian Superliga - Best Setter
 2014/15 Brazilian Superliga - Best Setter
 2015 FIVB Club World Championship - Best Setter
 2015/16 Brazilian Superliga - Best Setter
 2016 South American Club Championship - Best Setter
 2016 FIVB Club World Championship - Most Valuable Player
 2017 South American Club Championship - Best Setter
 2016/17 Brazilian Superliga - Best Setter
 2017/18 Brazilian Superliga – Best Setter
 2018/19 Brazilian Superliga – Best Setter

References

External links
FIVB profile

1979 births
Living people
Brazilian men's volleyball players
Olympic volleyball players of Brazil
Brazilian people of Panamanian descent
Volleyball players at the 2016 Summer Olympics
Medalists at the 2016 Summer Olympics
Olympic gold medalists for Brazil
Olympic medalists in volleyball
Sportspeople from São Paulo
Setters (volleyball)